Benapole railway station is a railway station in Bangladesh situated in Benapole of Jessore District, close to the Bangladesh–India border. It is used to import goods from India. It is part of the Petrapole-Benapole line connecting Benapole to Petrapole in India.

Train services

References 

Rail
Buildings and structures in Khulna Division
Khulna Division
Railway stations in Jessore District